Indian Railways offers various travel classes on their coaches. Depending upon their travel class, the passenger cars feature different seating arrangements or berths subject to availability.

Coaches

The following table lists combinations of class-accommodations in normal operation.

Classification of berths and seats

Berths are classified as follows:

LB = Lower Berth.
MB = Middle Berth.
UB = Upper Berth. 
SL = Side Lower Berth.
SM = Side Middle Berth.
SU = Side Upper Berth.

Seater train coaches have no berths, and only the seater coaches(EA, EC, CC, 2S) are classified into three types, which are:

WS = Window Side
M = Middle (only in CC and 2S)
A = Aisle

Middle and Aisle seats are not mentioned in the train ticket. Only Window Side (WS) seats are mentioned in the ticket.

These sitting arrangements are applicable also for Double Deck coaches.

Gallery

See also

 Rail transport in India

References

External links
Indian Railways - Online Passenger Reservation Site Providing Availability etc..
Indian Railway Catering and Tourism Corporation Limited - Online PasseSite